Darvar (also Romanized as Darvār and Darwar; also known as Darbār and Gazvār) is a village in Tuyehdarvar Rural District, Amirabad District, Damghan County, Semnan Province, Iran. At the 2006 census, its population was 709, in 223 families.

References 

Populated places in Damghan County